Patrik Myslovič (born 28 May 2001) is a Slovak professional footballer who currently plays  as a midfielder for Aberdeen, on loan from Fortuna Liga club Žilina.

Club career

MŠK Žilina
Myslovič joined the Academy of MŠK Žilina in 2014. 

He made his Fortuna Liga debut for Žilina against Senica on 23 February 2019. Myslovič began the game in the starting line-up but was replaced by Martin Gamboš in the second half. Žilina won the game by a sole first half goal by Michal Tomič.

Aberdeen F.C. 
Myslovic signed for Scottish club Aberdeen on loan in January 2023, with an exclusive option to buy at the end of the loan spell.

International career
In December 2022, Myslovič was first recognised in a Slovak senior national team nomination by Francesco Calzona and was immediately shortlisted for prospective players' training camp at NTC Senec.

References

External links
 MŠK Žilina official club profile 
 
 Futbalnet profile 
 

2001 births
Living people
People from Turčianske Teplice
Sportspeople from the Žilina Region
Slovak footballers
Slovakia youth international footballers
Slovakia under-21 international footballers
Association football midfielders
MŠK Žilina players
2. Liga (Slovakia) players
Slovak Super Liga players
Slovak expatriate footballers
Slovak expatriate sportspeople in Scotland
Expatriate footballers in Scotland
Aberdeen F.C. players